Smithfield High School is a high school in the Apple Valley section of Smithfield, Rhode Island near Greenville, Rhode Island, USA (in Providence County). The high school, which opened in 1966, was designed by the architect, Joseph M. Mosher. Prior to that date Smithfield students generally attended high schools in Providence or North Providence. Smithfield High School is the only public high school in the Town of Smithfield. High School graduations typically take place at nearby Bryant University. The school was ranked 17th out of 52 high schools in Rhode Island in 2006.

Athletics
Smithfield High School's mascot is a Sentinel, and its colors are green and gold. The high school athletes compete in the Rhode Island Interscholastic League (RIIL) in which most of Rhode Island's public and private schools compete.

See also
List of high schools in Rhode Island

References

External links

Public high schools in Rhode Island
Schools in Providence County, Rhode Island
1966 establishments in Rhode Island
Educational institutions established in 1966